In mathematics, a Nichols algebra is a Hopf algebra in a braided category assigned to an object V in this category (e.g. a braided vector space). The Nichols algebra is a quotient of the tensor algebra of V enjoying a certain universal property and is typically infinite-dimensional. Nichols algebras appear naturally in any pointed Hopf algebra and enabled their classification in important cases. The most well known examples for Nichols algebras are the Borel parts  of the infinite-dimensional quantum groups when q is no root of unity, and the first examples of finite-dimensional Nichols algebras are the Borel parts  of the Frobenius–Lusztig kernel (small quantum group) when q is a root of unity.

For more details on Nichols algebras see Nichols algebra.
 There are two major cases:
  abelian, which implies  is diagonally braided .
  nonabelian.
 The rank is the number of irreducible summands  in the semisimple Yetter–Drinfel'd module . 
 The irreducible summands  are each associated to a conjugacy class  and an irreducible representation  of the centralizer .
 To any Nichols algebra there is by  attached 
 a generalized root system and a Weyl groupoid. These are classified in. 
 In particular several Dynkin diagrams (for inequivalent types of Weyl chambers). Each Dynkin diagram has one vertex per irreducible  and edges depending on their braided commutators in the Nichols algebra.  
 The Hilbert series of the graded algebra  is given. An observation is that it factorizes in each case into polynomials . We only give the Hilbert series and dimension of the Nichols algebra in characteristic .

Note that a Nichols algebra only depends on the braided vector space  and can therefore be realized over many different groups. Sometimes there are two or three Nichols algebras with different  and non-isomorphic Nichols algebra, which are closely related (e.g. cocycle twists of each other). These are given by different conjugacy classes in the same column.

State of classification 

(as of 2015)

Established classification results 

 Finite-dimensional diagonal Nichols algebras over the complex numbers were classified by Heckenberger in. The case of arbitrary characteristic is ongoing work of Heckenberger, Wang.
 Finite-dimensional Nichols algebras of semisimple Yetter–Drinfel'd modules of rank >1 over finite nonabelian groups (generated by the support) were classified by Heckenberger and Vendramin in.

Negative criteria 

The case of rank 1 (irreducible Yetter–Drinfel'd module) over a nonabelian group is still largely open, with few examples known.

Much progress has been made by Andruskiewitsch and others by finding subracks (for example diagonal ones) that would lead to infinite-dimensional Nichols algebras. As of 2015, known groups not admitting finite-dimensional Nichols algebras are  
 for alternating groups  
 for symmetric groups  except a short list of examples
 some group of Lie type such as most  and most unipotent classes in  
 all sporadic groups except a short list of possibilities (resp. conjugacy classes in ATLAS notation) that are all real or j = 3-quasireal:
...for the Fisher group  the classes 
...for the baby monster group B the classes 
...for the monster group M the classes 
Usually a large amount of conjugacy classes ae of type D ("not commutative enough"), while the others tend to possess sufficient abelian subracks and can be excluded by their consideration. Several cases have to be done by-hand. Note that the open cases tend to have very small centralizers (usually cyclic) and representations χ (usually the 1-dimensional sign representation). Significant exceptions are the conjugacy classes of order 16, 32 having as centralizers p-groups of order 2048 resp. 128 and currently no restrictions on χ.

Over abelian groups 

The small quantum groups  are a special case  , but there are several exceptional examples involving the primes 2,3,4,5,7.

Recently there has been progress understanding the other examples as exceptional Lie algebras and super-Lie algebras in finite characteristic.

Over nonabelian group, rank > 1

Nichols algebras from Coxeter groups 
They discovered in this way the following first Nichols algebras over nonabelian groups :

The case  is the rank 1 diagonal Nichols algebra  of dimension 2.

Other Nichols algebras of rank 1

Nichols algebras of rank 2, type Gamma-3 

These Nichols algebras were discovered during the classification of Heckenberger and Vendramin.

The Nichols algebra of rank 2 type Gamma-4 

 This Nichols algebra was discovered during the classification of Heckenberger and Vendramin.

The Nichols algebra of rank 2, type T 

 This Nichols algebra was discovered during the classification of Heckenberger and Vendramin.

The Nichols algebra of rank 3 involving Gamma-3 

 This Nichols algebra was the last Nichols algebra discovered during the classification of Heckenberger and Vendramin.

Nichols algebras from diagram folding 

The following families Nichols algebras were constructed by Lentner using diagram folding, the fourth example appearing only in characteristic 3 was discovered during the classification of Heckenberger and Vendramin.

The construction start with a known Nichols algebra (here diagonal ones related to quantum groups) and an additional automorphism of the Dynkin diagram. Hence the two major cases are whether this automorphism exchanges two disconnected copies or is a proper diagram automorphism of a connected Dynkin diagram. The resulting root system is folding / restriction of the original root system. By construction, generators and relations are known from the diagonal case.

The following two are obtained by proper automorphisms of the connected Dynkin diagrams 

Poster with all Nichols algebras known so far

(Simon Lentner, University Hamburg, please feel free to write comments/corrections/wishes in this matter: simon.lentner at uni-hamburg.de)

References
 
 

 

Hopf algebras
Quantum groups
Mathematics-related lists